Sanchai and Sonchat Ratiwatana were the defending champions but lost in the semifinals to Hsieh Cheng-peng and Yang Tsung-hua.

Hsieh and Yang won the title after defeating Hsu Yu-hsiou and Jimmy Wang 6–7(3–7), 6–2, [10–8] in the final.

Seeds

Draw

References
 Main Draw

OEC Kaohsiung - Doubles
2018 Doubles
2018 in Taiwanese tennis